Adolf Piltz (8 December 1855 – 1940) was a German mathematician who contributed to number theory. Piltz was arguably the first to formulate a generalized Riemann hypothesis, in 1884.

Notes

References
Davenport, Harold. Multiplicative number theory. Third edition. Revised and with a preface by Hugh L. Montgomery. Graduate Texts in Mathematics, 74. Springer-Verlag, New York, 2000. xiv+177 pp. .

Further reading

External links

1855 births
1940 deaths
19th-century German mathematicians
Humboldt University of Berlin alumni
20th-century German mathematicians